Tomislav Brkić and Nikola Ćaćić were the defending champions but lost in the semifinals to Santiago González and Andrés Molteni.

González and Molteni went on to win the title, defeating Fabio Fognini and Horacio Zeballos in the final, 6–1, 6–1.

Seeds

Draw

Draw

References

External links
 Main draw

Argentina Open - Doubles
ATP Buenos Aires